Fernando Quevedo Rodríguez (born 12 May 1956) is a Guatemalan physicist.  He was the director of the Abdus Salam International Centre for Theoretical Physics (ICTP) between October 2009 and November 2019.

Quevedo was born in 1956 in San José, Costa Rica and obtained his early education in Guatemala. He obtained his BSc in physics from the Universidad del Valle de Guatemala in 1979, and his Ph.D. from the University of Texas at Austin in 1986 under the supervision of Nobel laurate Steven Weinberg. Following a string of research appointments at CERN, Switzerland, McGill University in Canada, Institut de Physique in Neuchatel, Switzerland, and the Los Alamos National Laboratory, USA, as well as a brief term as professor of physics at the National Autonomous University of Mexico (UNAM). Dr. Quevedo later joined the Department of Applied Mathematics and Theoretical Physics at the University of Cambridge, UK, in 1998, where he has been Professor of Theoretical Physics and Fellow of Gonville and Caius College.

He has been awarded the Royal Society Wolfson Research Merit Award, Doctorate Honoris Causa from Universidad de San Carlos de Guatemala and Universidad del Valle de Guatemala, John Solomon Guggenheim Foundation Fellowship and, alongside Anamaría Font, won the 1998 ICTP Prize. He has been a fellow of the World Academy of Sciences since 2010. He has authored more than 100 papers.

He has taught courses on differential equations, complex methods, supersymmetry and extra dimensions. He has discussed the importance of international research institutions for science diplomacy.

References 

Guatemalan physicists
People associated with CERN
Living people
Cambridge mathematicians
Fellows of Gonville and Caius College, Cambridge
1956 births